Tony Trisciani (born April 24, 1973) is an American football coach and former player. He is the head football coach at Elon University in Elon, North Carolina a position he has held since the 2019 season. Before becoming head coach, Trisciani was the defensive coordinator for the Elon Phoenix under head coach Curt Cignetti. Trisciani also served as the defensive backs coach and special teams coordinator at Elon in 2006. He was named the head coach of Elon on December 17, 2018 after Curt Cignetti resigned to become the head coach at James Madison. Trisciani was the head football coach at Whitehall High School in Whitehall Township, Lehigh County, Pennsylvania from 2007 to 2011.

Head coaching record

College

References

External links
 Elon profile

1973 births
Living people
Alfred Saxons football coaches
Elon Phoenix football coaches
Lehigh Mountain Hawks football coaches
New Hampshire Wildcats football coaches
Springfield Pride football coaches
Springfield Pride football players
Villanova Wildcats football coaches
High school football coaches in Pennsylvania